This is a list of airlines of Oceania currently in operation.

Oceania

American Samoa

Australia

Christmas Island

Cocos (Keeling) Islands

Cook Islands

Easter Island

Fiji

French Polynesia

Guam

Hawaii

Kiribati

Marshall Islands

Nauru

New Caledonia

New Zealand

Niue

Norfolk Island

Northern Mariana Islands

Palau

Papua New Guinea

Samoa

Solomon Islands

Tonga
Tonga has no active airlines.

Tuvalu
Tuvalu has no active airlines.

Vanuatu

Wallis and Futuna
Wallis and Futuna has no active airlines.

Notes 
Pitcairn Islands has no airports.
Tokelau has no airports.

See also 
 List of defunct airlines of Oceania